Bang Khae is one of the 50 districts (khet) of Bangkok, Thailand. Its neighbouring districts, clockwise from north, are Thawi Watthana, Taling Chan, Phasi Charoen, Bang Bon, and Nong Khaem district.

History
From 6 March 1998, Phasi Charoen Sakha 1 district was combined with Lak Song sub-district, formerly part of Nong Khaem District, to form a new district, called Khet Bang Khae. The sub-districts of the new Bang Khae district then consisted of Bang Khae, Bang Khae Nuea, Bang Phai and Lak Song.

Together with the creation of the district, the four sub-districts of Bang Khae were reorganised for administrative purposes. In 2009 the subdistrict boundaries were adjusted again.

Its name means "county of the hummingbird tree"; presumably, in the past there was a large population of this species in the district.

Administration
The district is divided into four sub-districts (khwaeng).

References

External links
 Bang Khae district office 

 
districts of Bangkok